Jorge Alberto Bontemps (August 21, 1977 – April 13, 2010) was an Argentine football defender.

Club career
Bontemps started his career in 1999 with Colón de Santa Fe before moving to Club Atlético Huracán in 2004.

Illness and death
Since 2006 Bontemps has been sidelined by disease and has not made any appearances for the first team.

On 13 April 2010 he died of lung cancer in the José María Cullen hospital in Santa Fe.

References

1977 births
2010 deaths
Argentine people of French descent
Footballers from Santa Fe, Argentina
Association football defenders
Argentine footballers
Club Atlético Colón footballers
Club Atlético Huracán footballers
Argentine Primera División players
Deaths from lung cancer in Argentina